Abdul Qadir was a Pakistani banker who served as the second Governor of the State Bank of Pakistan and as the 2nd Finance Secretary of Pakistan.

Born in 1903 at Jallandhar, British India, Qadir was educated at Forman Christian College, Lahore. Before 1947, he had served as Income Tax Commissioner of the Punjab, Delhi and NWFP. Later, in Pakistan, he was appointed Chairman of Central Board of Revenue – now known as Federal Board of Revenue.

References

Governors of the State Bank of Pakistan
Forman Christian College alumni
1903 births
Year of death missing